The 1996 Paris–Tours was the 90th edition of the Paris–Tours cycle race and was held on 6 October 1996. The race started in Paris and finished in Tours. The race was won by Nicola Minali of the Gewiss team.

General classification

References

1996 in French sport
1996
Paris-Tours
1996 in road cycling
October 1996 sports events in Europe